WSSU (88.5 FM) is a radio station licensed to Superior, Wisconsin, and serving the Duluth/Superior area. The station is part of Wisconsin Public Radio (WPR), and airs WPR's "NPR News and Classical Network", consisting of classical music and news and talk programming.   WSSU also broadcasts local news and programming from studios in the Holden Fine and Applied Arts Center at the University of Wisconsin-Superior.

The WSSU call letters had originally been on sister Ideas Network station KUWS from its sign-on in 1966 until 1988.  From 1989 to 1995, WSSU was used by a Springfield, IL public radio station which was formerly WSSR and later WUIS.

See also Wisconsin Public Radio

References

External links
Wisconsin Public Radio

SSU
University of Wisconsin–Superior
Wisconsin Public Radio
Classical music radio stations in the United States
NPR member stations